Manchester is a city in Northwest England.  The M12 postcode area is to the east of the centre of the city and includes the district of Ardwick.  This postcode area contains 16 listed buildings that are recorded in the National Heritage List for England.  Of these, two are listed at Grade II*, the middle of the three grades, and the others are at Grade II, the lowest grade.  Most of the listed buildings are houses.  The other listed buildings include a former charity hospital with associated structures including two monuments, two churches, a drill hall, a shop, and a theatre.


Key

Buildings

References

Citations

Sources

Lists of listed buildings in Greater Manchester
Buildings and structures in Manchester